Zederbaum, Cederbaum are surnames of:

 Aleksander Zederbaum (1816–1893), Polish-Russian Jewish journalist
 Julius Zederbaum (1873–1923), Russian politician and revolutionary

Cederbaum
 Henryk Cederbaum (1863–1928), Polish lawyer
 Lorenz S. Cederbaum (born 1946), German physical chemist

German-language surnames
Jewish surnames